Alessandrina Lonardo (born March 9, 1953 in Ceppaloni), also known as Sandra Lonardo, is an Italian politician. She is a senator of the Republic of Italy and is a member of the Legislature XVIII of Italy.

Biography 
Born in the hamlet of San Giovanni, in the municipality of Ceppaloni, she grew up in her hometown. At the age of 12, she moved with her family to Oyster Bay, on the island of Long Island in Nassau County (United States), continuing her studies at Oyster Bay High School. Once back in Italy she obtained the high school diploma and graduated in Philosophy at the Oriental University Institute of Naples.

References 

Living people
1953 births
Italian politicians
20th-century Italian women
21st-century Italian women